A corporate work is an official organization or function of Opus Dei, a part of the Roman Catholic Church.  Because Opus Dei is a personal prelature, its corporate works are almost always independent of the territorial dioceses which they operate in, in contrast to almost all other operations of the Catholic Church, which have to report to their diocesan bishop.

See also
 Opus Dei in society

External links
 Opus Dei Corporate Works — an explanation of corporate works and overview of various works on each continent

Religious (Catholicism)
Opus Dei
Catholic Church organisation